Ivanson Ranny "Johnny" Nelson  (born 4 January 1967) is a British boxing analyst and former professional boxer who competed from 1986 to 2005. He held the WBO cruiserweight title from 1999 to 2006, and remains the longest reigning cruiserweight world champion of all time. Nelson defended the title against thirteen different opponents, more than any other cruiserweight in history, and holds a joint-record of most consecutive cruiserweight title defences (along with Marco Huck). He also never lost the title in the ring. At regional level, he held the British cruiserweight title twice between 1989 and 1997, and the European cruiserweight title twice between 1990 and 1998.

Professional career
Nelson began training at Wincobank gym in Sheffield under trainer Brendan Ingle who also went on to train Naseem Hamed and Kell Brook. He began his career losing ten of his thirteen bouts contested as an amateur.

Nelson's 15th defence of his WBO cruiserweight title was scheduled to be against Welshman Enzo Maccarinelli on the undercard for the Joe Calzaghe versus Jeff Lacy WBO/IBF unification bout on 6 March 2006, but a knee injury picked up by Nelson during sparring forced the fight to be cancelled and Nelson announced his decision to retire from professional boxing a few months later on 22 September 2006.

Life after boxing
Nelson currently works as an analyst for Sky Sports. Since retirement he has spent some time working with the prison service helping inmates with life management skills. He has also done some charity work, agreeing to fight a charity match against Jos Battle.

Nelson was appointed Member of the Order of the British Empire (MBE) in the 2023 New Year Honours for services to boxing and to young people in South Yorkshire.

Personal life
Nelson's mother was Cuban-Jamaican, his father was Dominican. Nelson's parents split up when he was a young child and he did not reunite with his biological father until he was in his thirties. In 2010, Nelson published his autobiography, Hard Road to Glory.

Professional boxing record

References

External links

1967 births
Living people
Sportspeople from Sheffield
World Boxing Organization champions
Black British sportspeople
English male boxers
English people of Cuban descent
English people of Jamaican descent
English people of Dominica descent
European Boxing Union champions
Heavyweight boxers
World cruiserweight boxing champions
British Boxing Board of Control champions
Members of the Order of the British Empire